Belver is a Portuguese civil parish in the municipality of Gavião, district of Portalegre. The population in 2011 was 684, in an area of 69.84 km2. It is situated along the northern bank of the Tagus River.

History

On 13 June 1194, the region of Belver was donated by King Sancho I of Portugal to the Knights Hospitaller, with the condition that the knights were required to build a castle in the site.

Between 1383 and 1385, Belver aligned itself with the forces of Leonor Telles de Menezes against the Master of Avis.

In the 16th century, the parochial church was constructed. On 18 May 1518, King Manuel I of Portugal conceded a foral (charter) to Belver.

In the 17th century, the village was surveyed by Pedro Nunes Tinoco, and determined to be under the authority of the Priory of Crato.

In 1836, the municipality of Belver was extinguished and the region was integrated into the municipality of Mação. This remained in effect until the end of the century, when in 1898 it was integrated into the municipality of Gavião.

In 1905 a bridge was completed over the Ribeira de Belver.

Geography
Belver is the northernmost civil parish of the municipality, and the only on the northern margin of the Tagus River (the remaining parishes of Gavião are on lands south of the Tagus). It is bordered by Gavião and Atalaia parishes (in the south), while surrounded by the parishes of Envendos, Mação and Ortiga (in the neighbouring municipality of Mação) to the northeast, north and northwest, respectively.

The parish is situated in river valley,  from the right margin of the Tagus River, along the confluence of the Ribeira de Belver. Surrounding these hilltops are several olive orchards.

It is accessible by rail-link (the Beira Baixa railway), with its stop in the city centre.

Architecture

Archaeological
 Dolmen of Penedo Gordo

Civic
 Belver Dam
 Domingos da Vinha Museum
 Old Fountain (Degracia)

Military
 Castle of Belver

Religious
 Chapel of São Brás
 Church of Nossa Senhora da Visitação
 Hermitage of Nossa Senhora do Pilar

References
Notes

Sources
 
 
 

Freguesias of Gavião, Portugal